Victor Leslie George (5 June 1908 – 10 August 1996) was a New Zealand rugby union player.

He was born in Winton, New Zealand.

His playing position was Prop.

Les or 'Tussock' as he was known, played 3 tests for the All Blacks on the 1938 tour of Australia. He also played 66 matches for Southland in the NPC.

The outbreak of World War II brought George's playing days to an end. After the War he was on the Southland union executive from 1949 to 1975, was the union president in 1956–57 and the representative selector-coach in 1956–64. He became a South Island selector in 1961 and from 1964 to 1970 was on the All Black selection panel. He was on the New Zealand union council in 1966–72.

George died on 10 August 1996 in Wanaka, New Zealand.

External links
All Blacks Profile
ESPN database

1908 births
1996 deaths
New Zealand rugby union players
People from Winton, New Zealand
Southland rugby union players
New Zealand international rugby union players
Rugby union players from Southland, New Zealand
Rugby union props